The University of Glasgow Medico-Chirurgical Society is a student society at the University of Glasgow which organises social and educational events for medical students at the University. The President for 2022/23 is Elliott Shaw.

History
Founded in 1802, Med-Chir is one of the oldest medical societies in Scotland The society was formed twelve years before practising physicians and surgeons in Glasgow began to meet for formal instruction.

It is one of the oldest societies in the University and was instrumental in founding the Glasgow University Union in 1890, along with the Glasgow University Dialectic Society, Comunn Oiseanach Oilthigh Ghlaschu, and Glasgow University Athletic Club. It retains close ties with the Glasgow University Union. In 1936, the society arranged an excursion to Hamburg, Berlin and London.

Activities
The University of Glasgow Medico-Chirurgical Society, AKA MedChir, is one of Glasgow University’s longest running societies and has been making Thursday nights fun since 1802. MedChir are responsible for organising the biggest and best social nights, educational events and sports for Glasgow University Medical Students. At its 2022 Annual General Meeting, MedChir members approved a constitutional amendment granting the incumbent Treasurer the optional title of "Chancellor of the ExMedchir". The first "Chancellor of the ExMedchir" is Daniel Petrie, the officeholder for the 2022/23 session. 

MedChir also raise money for a different charity each year. Previous year's chosen charities have been SeeMe, a mental health organisation looking to end the stigma surrounding mental health. The chosen charity for 2016–2017 is Children's Hospice Association Scotland (C.H.A.S.).

MedChir organise major social events, with the highlights being the Annual Medical School Ball, the Revue (all-medic talent competition, won by Emeli Sandé during her time at Glasgow Medical School), Field Trip and Beer Olympics. They also offer talks from the most prestigious speakers in their fields, events for students to practice their clinical skills and hold joint evenings with the Royal College of General Practitioners and Royal College of Physicians and Surgeons. MedChir members participate in the Scottish and Northern Irish Medics Sports tournament (SNIMS) every year, hosting and winning the event in November 2016 (with Edinburgh University finishing bottom), bringing their unbeaten run into their sixth year.

Additionally, 'Surgo' has been MedChir’s in-house publication since 1935 and it provides a light-hearted look at medic life as well as anything else that catches the editorial team’s eyes.

MedChir has its own medics Football, Rugby, Netball, Badminton, Squash, Basketball, Ultimate Frisbee and Hockey clubs. After many years of trialling different sports, members of the society still felt unsatisfied with the ping-pong shaped hole that remained in their hearts. In 2018, it was announced that this hole would be filled thanks to the founding of the MedChir Table Tennis club by Daniel Dolan (Alumni Representative), Conor Beatty (5th Year Representative) and Patrick Hart (Intercalated Year Representative). The Club competed for the first time in the 2018 SNIMS competition held in Dundee. The MedChir rugby team won the West of Scotland cup in December 2018, defeating Birkmyre RFC convincingly.

Former members
Many illustrious former members maintain a link with the society and the MedChir Life Members Tie has been spotted on more than a few occasions, notably when Sam Galbraith presented the Scottish Cup. During the 2011-12 session the MedChir Life Members Badge was introduced.

Archives
The archives for the University of Glasgow Medico-Chirurgical Society are maintained by the  Archives of the University of Glasgow (GUAS).

References

External links 
 

1802 establishments in Scotland
Medico-Chirugical Society
Scottish medical associations
Medical associations based in the United Kingdom